The Launceston Players Society is an Australian theatre company, formed in September 1926 in Launceston Tasmania.

It is one of the oldest theatre companies in Australia.

Since 1926, the Launceston Players have put on shows such as Lock Up Your Daughters, My Fair Lady, and Evita. Musicals, dramas, comedies, Theatre Restaurant, street theatre, play readings and commercials have all been part of the repertoire of the company. In recent years one of our more memorable and successful productions was the staging of the world's most popular musical, Les Misérables. This production involved more community input than any other show staged by the Players, with local government agencies, private enterprise, business houses and commercial companies all contributing to the final product.

External links 
 

Amateur theatre companies in Australia